Harry Kennedy Morton Jr. (March 20, 1889 – May 10, 1956) was a vaudeville dancer and singer as well as a prizefighter.

Biography
He was born on March 20, 1889, in Decatur, Alabama to Harry Kennedy Morton Sr. (died 1919) and Annie Duncan (1853-1902), who were also variety performers. He married Zella Russell.

He appeared in Blossom Time in 1938 and The Street Singer in 1929 as well as Polly in the same year. He appeared in Countess Maritza in 1926.

He died on May 10, 1956, of throat cancer in Roosevelt Hospital in Manhattan.

Archive
His papers are archived at the New York Public Library.

Performances
The Sweetheart Shop (1920)
Love Dreams (1921)
Springtime of Youth (1922)
The Love Song (1925)
Countess Maritza (1926)
Polly (1929)
The Street Singer (1929)
Blossom Time (1938)

References

External links
Harry K. Morton image at the New York Public Library
 (archive)

1889 births
1956 deaths
Vaudeville performers
Deaths from throat cancer
People from Decatur, Alabama